The 1947 Holy Cross Crusaders football team was an American football team represented the College of the Holy Cross as an independent during the 1947 college football season.  In its third and final season under head coach Ox DaGrosa, the team compiled a 4–4–2 record and outscored opponents by a total of 144 to 75. The team played its home games at Fitton Field in Worcester, Massachusetts.

Schedule

References

Holy Cross
Holy Cross Crusaders football seasons
Holy Cross Crusaders football